The Mission of Amr b. Umayyah al-Damri against Abu Sufyan occurred in AH 4 of the Islamic Calendar i.e. AD 625.

According to Ar-Rahīq al-Makhtum (the Sealed Nectar), a modern Islamic biography of Muhammad written by the Indian Muslim author Safi-ur Rahman Mubarakpuri, biographers have said that Amr bin Umayyah al-Damri was sent on an errand to kill Abu Sufyan (the leader of the Quraysh), who had also sent a Bedouin to kill Muhammad. The Mission was unsuccessful, but Amr bin Umayyah al-Damri killed three polytheists along the way.

The Mission

Reason for mission
Muhammad ordered the Mission of Amr bin Umayyah al-Damri to assassinate Abu Sufyan to avenge Khubyab bin Adi. According to the Muslim scholar Safiur Rahman Mubarakpuri, the Quraysh ordered Khubyab bin Adi to be crucified by Uqba bin al-Harith because he had killed Uqba bin al-Harith's father.

Events during the mission
Per Al-Tabari, Amr bin Umayyah al-Damri set out and first visited the Ka'bah where he was spotted by one of the Meccans. The Muslim assassins then fled and hid in a cave. While the Muslims were still in the cave Uthman bin Malik al-Taymi came close riding his horse while they were hiding. Then Amr bin Umayyah al-Damri came out of hiding and killed him, he "stabbed him below the breast" with a dagger and al-Taymi gave out a loud scream which other Meccans heard.

The Muslims remained in the cave until the pursuers left. They then went to al-Tanim and found the spot where Khubyab bin Adi was crucified on a cross. Al-Damri untied Khubayb from the cross, and traveled "forty paces" before he was spotted. He dropped Khubayb's body and again hid in a cave.

While he was in the cave a Bedouin shepherd from the Banu Bakr tribe passed by, he had one eye as he had lost an eye .He asked "Who is there?", al-Damri replied: "One of the Banu Bakr.". The Bedouin lay down next to al-Damri and began to sing "♬ I will not be a Muslim as long as I live ♬" and al-Damri replied "You will soon see!". The Bedouin then went to sleep and al-Damri states:
I went to him and killed him in the most dreadful way that anybody has ever killed anybody. I leant over him, stuck the end of my bow into his good eye, and thrust it down until it came out of the back of his neck. After that I rushed out like a wild beast [Tabari, Volume 7, p. 148]

Al-Damri then fled and came to a place called al-Naqi. At this place there were two Meccans sent as spies by the Quraysh to check on Muhammad. Al-Damri "shot an arrow at one of them and killed him", and he then called on the other spy to surrender. After he surrendered, he tied him up, brought him to Muhammad and told him what happened after being questioned about it. Muhammad looked at him and laughed.
"Well done!" he said, and prayed for me to be blessed. [Tabari, Volume 7, p. 148]

Islamic primary sources
The incident is mentioned by the Sunni Muslim scholar Tabari, in Tabari, Volume 7 as follows:

See also
Military career of Muhammad
List of expeditions of Muhammad

References

625
Campaigns ordered by Muhammad
History of Mecca